Niki Massey (October 1980 - October 1, 2016) was an atheist blogger and speaker. She was on the advisory council of the American Humanist Association’s Feminist Humanist Alliance, and was one of the founding members of The Orbit, the "first atheist media site founded explicitly to work on all forms of social justice." She gave a presentation at Skepticon 8 in 2015 (called "Reproductive Justice: Activism on the Sidewalk") unexpectedly, when a scheduled speaker failed to arrive.

She also volunteered as a clinic escort at Planned Parenthood, and wrote erotica.

Personal life 
Massey described herself as (among other things) black, poor, a "feminist with womanist leanings", "on the asexual spectrum," a gamer, and a geek. She experienced numerous health issues, including depression, attention deficit disorder, PTSD, generalized anxiety disorder, chronic pain and fatigue.

Stephanie Zvan considered her a friend.

References

External links 
 Bi Any Means Podcast #61: Reproductive Justice and Atheist A-holes with Niki Massey
 Niki Massey's blog SERIOUSLY?!?

1980 births
2016 deaths
African-American atheists
African-American feminists
American atheists
American feminists
Asexual women
20th-century African-American people
21st-century African-American people
20th-century African-American women
21st-century African-American women